The Hatfield Marine Science Center (HMSC) is a marine science research and education center next to Yaquina Bay of the Pacific Ocean in the U.S. state of Oregon. It is operated by Oregon State University in cooperation with five state and federal agencies co-located on site. Named after Mark Hatfield, a former U.S. Senator from Oregon, the HMSC occupies a  site in Newport.

History
The Hatfield Marine Science Center was opened in 1965. The center was preceded by the Yaquina Bay Fisheries Laboratory, which was established in 1939 on the opposite side of Yaquina Bay.

After several years of development, the Gladys Valley Marine Studies Building (MSB) was completed in winter 2019. The building hosts new office and laboratory space, a 250-seat auditorium and a cafe. The building provides a tsunami evacuation point for more than 900 people, including local residents, and it is designed to withstand a 9+ magnitude earthquake and an XXL tsunami event.

Organization
More than 300 people work at the HMSC, including Oregon State University faculty, graduate students, researchers, and staff from agencies including Oregon Department of Fish and Wildlife, U.S. Fish and Wildlife Service, U.S. Environmental Protection Agency, U.S. Department of Agriculture, and the National Oceanic and Atmospheric Administration (NOAA).  NOAA employees at the HMSC are affiliated with the Alaska Fisheries Science Center, Northwest Fisheries Science Center, or the Pacific Marine Environmental Laboratory, all of which are headquartered in Seattle, Washington.

Visitor Center

The Hatfield Marine Science Visitor Center is the public education wing of the HMSC. The visitor center's exhibits focus on marine species, marine research, and the coastal environment. The visitor center offers public programs and tours and is open year-round. Admission is by donation.

Live marine animals on display include a Giant Pacific octopus.  The octopus can be viewed remotely through the live HMSC OctoCam. Other exhibits focus on weather, tsunami, commercial fishing, ocean resource management, microscopic sea life, and tide-pool creatures and habitats. The Newmas, a locally built, 13 foot two-person submarine is on display outside the visitor center.

Education
Undergraduate and graduate students study at HMSC. The newly built Gladys Valley Marine Studies Building has been proposed to host year-round body of 500 undergraduate students.

Research Partnerships

HMSC hosts multiple research partnerships between Oregon State University and external organizations.

The Cooperative Institute for Marine Resources Studies (CIMRS) conducts interdisciplinary research covering fisheries science, aquaculture, marine ecosystems and climate, oceanography, geology, acoustics and marine-resource technology. In addition to HMSC employees, CIMRS involves staff from NOAA's Northwest Fisheries Science Center, the Alaska Fisheries Science Center, and Pacific Marine Environmental Laboratory.

The Coastal Oregon Marine Experiment Station (COMES) is an agricultural research station dedicated to research and development for Oregon’s fishing, aquaculture and seafood, and helps to facilitate Oregon State University's service as a land-grant university for coastal communities. COMES is the largest of 12 branch agricultural research stations in Oregon. COMES is also hosted at the Seafood Research & Education Center in Astoria.

The Marine Mammal Institute (MMI) focuses on research on marine mammals, incorporating research on ecology, genetics, veterinary medicine, engineering, aquaculture, and communications.

The Northwest National Marine Renewable Energy Center (NNMREC) is a collaboration between Oregon State University and the University of Washington, and was founded with funding from the U.S. Department of Energy. It is one of three Marine Renewable Energy centers for Oregon State University, with research focused on wave and tidal energy.

The Northwest Association of Networked Ocean Observing Systems (NANOOS) is a collaboration between Oregon State University and the U.S. Environmental Protection Agency, which hosts oceanographic monitoring data collected at Yaquina Bay.

Research fleet

The OSU College of Oceanic and Atmospheric Sciences operates two research vessels out of the home port adjacent to the center. In addition, the NOAA Marine Operations Center-Pacific (MOC-P), adjacent to HMSC, is also the home port for the NOAAS Bell M. Shimada and the NOAAS Rainier. These research vessels are frequently used by HMSC staff.

Current vessels
 R/V Taani – 199 feet long, under construction
 R/V Oceanus – 177 feet long
 R/V Elakha – 54 feet long

Retired vessels
 R/V Acona
 R/V Cayuse – 80 feet long
 R/V Wecoma – 184.5 feet long
 R/V Yaquina – 180 feet long

People

Directors
 Bob Cowen 2013 – Present
 George Boehlert 2002 – 2012
 Lavern Weber 1977 – 2002
 John Byrne 1972 – 1977

Notable faculty and staff (past and present)

 Scott Baker
 Lisa Ballance
 Michael Banks
 Willy Breese
 Wayne Burt
 Bill Chadwick
 Louise Copeman
 Christina DeWitt
 Roland Dimick
 R. Barry Fisher
 Steve Hammond
 Joe Haxel
 Joel Hedgpeth
 Sarah Henkel
 Scott Heppell
 Selina Heppell
 Robert Jacobson
 Christopher Langdon
 Cathy Lannan
 Jim Lannan
 Don Lyons
 Bob Malouf
 Bruce Mate
 Haruyoshi Matsumoto
 Bill McNeil
 David Mellinger
 Jessica Miller
 George Mpitsos
 Bob Olson
 Kathleen O'Malley
 Rachel Orben
 Daniel Palacios
 Jae W. Park
 Marilyn Potts Guin
 Anja Robinson
 Shawn Rowe
 Ivan Pratt
 David Sampson
 Su Sponagle
 Rob Suryan
 Gil Sylvia
 Leigh Torres
 George Waldbusser
 Janet Webster
 Will White
 Bill Wick

Notable alumni
 Rick Spinrad, 11th Administrator of NOAA (2021-)

See also 
 Oregon Coast Aquarium, a nearby tourist attraction in Newport, Oregon
 Sea Lion Caves, a nearby tourist attraction near Florence, Oregon
 Oregon Institute of Marine Biology, a related institution associated with the University of Oregon on the southern Oregon coast
 Moss Landing Marine Laboratories, a multi-campus marine research consortium of the California State University System
 Hopkins Marine Station, a similar research facility run by Stanford University in Monterey, California
 Scripps Institution of Oceanography, a similar research facility associated with the University of California, San Diego and located in La Jolla, California
 Woods Hole Oceanographic Institution, a similar research facility located in Woods Hole, Massachusetts

References

External links 
Hatfield Marine Science Center website
HMSC campus map
Hatfield Marine Science Center Oral History Interview

Aquaria in Oregon
Newport, Oregon
Oregon State University
Oregon State University buildings
Biological research institutes in the United States
Research institutes in Oregon
Museums in Lincoln County, Oregon
Natural history museums in Oregon
Maritime museums in Oregon
Laboratories in Oregon
1965 establishments in Oregon